Dale "Chip" Rosenbloom (born July 3, 1964) is an American filmmaker, known for Shiloh, Across the Tracks, and Fuel. He has produced twenty-five films and television movies. He was the co-owner and vice chairman of the Los Angeles Rams professional football franchise. From 2008 to 2010 he was the team's controlling owner, having inherited control of the team his family first acquired in the 1970s. Rosenbloom sold the family's remaining stake to co-owner Stan Kroenke in 2010. He is president of Rosenbloom Entertainment and founder/owner of Open Pictures.

Life and career
Rosenbloom was born July 3, 1964 in New York City. His father, Carroll Rosenbloom, was a businessman who, first with the Baltimore Colts and then the Los Angeles Rams, was the winningest owner in NFL history. Following his father's death in 1979, Rosenbloom's mother Georgia Frontiere became majority owner of the Rams. She later moved the team to St. Louis. Frontiere died in 2008, at which time Rosenbloom became controlling owner of the team. The family sold the majority interest in the team to Stan Kroenke at the end of the 2010 season. Rosenbloom remains a part owner of the Rams, and serves as the team's vice-chairman.

After graduating the USC Film School (now the USC School of Cinematic Arts) Rosenbloom began his career at Aaron Spelling Studios, followed by working in development for Mace Neufeld Productions. He began his career as an independent filmmaker in 1990. Among his films in the early 1990s were Across the Tracks, Nails, and the ABC movie Ride With the Wind. In 1997, he wrote, produced, and directed the multi-award-winning feature film Shiloh which tells the story of a young boy who rescues an abused dog.

Rosenbloom produced the WB Keri Russell vehicle Eight Days a Week. From here Rosenbloom began making documentary films. Notably, Reckless Indifference, is the true story of a teenage fight gone wrong and the sentencing injustice that followed. It won the International Press Academy Award, and is taught in several law schools.

In 2007, Rosenbloom produced the Weinstein Group film The Girl in the Park. That same year he was nominated for a Tony Award for producing the August Wilson play Radio Golf.

In 2008, he produced the documentary Fuel which was short-listed for an Oscar.

In 2013, Rosenbloom executive-produced The Call. Rosenbloom also executive-produced the film Careful What You Wish For.

Rosenbloom is producing the untitled Ryan Ferguson documentary, the story of a young man who was convicted of a murder based on the dream of a friend. A controversial case, it is being examined by director Andrew Jenks, and Rosenbloom is partnering with journalist Dylan Ratigan on this project, which explores the injustices of the justice system.

Additionally, he has written a number of songs for musical artists including Dayna Lane, Sheena Easton, and Rita Coolidge, and is the composer of the theatrical musical based on the Clint Eastwood movie Bronco Billy, set to premiere in 2015.

Charitable work
Rosenbloom has recently been active in social justice, and was among the people who signed Russell Simmons' letter to the President calling on the Federal Government to reform the mandatory minimum sentencing guidelines. He and his wife Kathleen were the seed financers behind the awareness campaign to help change these laws with Families Against Mandatory Minimums. Rosenbloom and his wife are also on the President's Council for Feeding America, the United States' largest hunger relief organization.(ANN) Additionally, he serves on the advisory boards of the Clinton Foundation Health Access Initiative, the Fulfillment Fund, the Veteran Jobs Corps, the Variety Club, Urban Farming, and Earth Justice.

Awards
Rosenbloom's productions have been honored with several awards, including the 2008 Sundance Film Festival Best Documentary Audience Award for Fuel, a 2007 Tony nomination of Best Play for his Broadway stage production of August Wilson's play Radio Golf, and then a 1997 Humanities Award and 1998 Genesis Award of Best Feature Film for his film Shiloh.

Filmography

Director

 Shiloh (1996)

Writer
 Instant Karma (1990)
 Shiloh (1996) 
 Shiloh 2: Shiloh Season (1999) 
 Saving Shiloh (2006)

Producer

 Instant Karma (1990)
  Across the Tracks (1991)
 Nails (1992)
 A Woman, Her Men, and Her Futon (1993)
 Ride With the Wind (1994) 
 Red Ribbon Blues (1995) 
 Shiloh (1996)
 Eight Days a Week (1997)
  Confessions of a Sexist Pig (1998)
  Shiloh 2: Shiloh Season (1999)
 Reckless Indifference (2001)
 Learn the Game: The Big Football Game (2004)
 Saving Shiloh (2006)
  Fan-Demanium (200)
 The Girl in the Park (2007)
 Alice Upside Down (2008) 
 Fuel (2008)
 Open Graves (2009)
  Make Me Young: Youth Knows No Pain (2010)
  Radio Free Albemuth (2011)
 Janeane from Des Moines (2012)
 Fame High (2012)
  The Call (2013)

Awards and nominations

Rosenbloom won Best Film, for Shiloh at the 1997 Chicago International Film Festival, the Crystal Heart Award for Shiloh at the 1997 Heartland Film Festival, the 1997 Humanities Award for Shiloh, the 1998 Genesis Award for Best Feature Film for Shiloh, garnered a 2007 Tony nomination of Best Play for Radio Golf, won the Best Documentary Audience Award for Fuel at the 2008 Sundance Film Festival, and the 2012 Silverdocs, Best Documentary award, for Fame High.

Personal life
In 1988, he married Kathleen Melville in the Beverly Hills Presbyterian Church. He resides in Los Angeles with his wife and their son Alexander and daughter Olivia.

References

External links
 

1964 births
American documentary filmmakers
Film producers from California
American people of Polish-Jewish descent
American people of Russian-Jewish descent
Businesspeople from Baltimore
Businesspeople from Los Angeles
Living people
Los Angeles Rams owners